Grigori Mamrikishvili (also Grigol Mamrikishvili, ; born 2 March 1981 in Tbilisi, Georgian SSR) is a Georgian judoka, who competed in the men's half-middleweight category. He picked up a total of ten medals in his career, including four from the World Judo Cup series and a bronze from the 2003 European U23 Championships in Nabeul, Tunisia, and represented his nation Georgia in the 81-kg class at the 2004 Summer Olympics.

Mamrikishvili qualified for the Georgian squad in the men's half-middleweight category (81 kg) at the 2004 Summer Olympics in Athens, by topping the field of judoka and granting a berth from the A-Tournament in his native Tbilisi. He lost his opening match to an experienced Estonian judoka and 2000 Olympic bronze medalist Aleksei Budõlin, who tossed him to the tatami for a waza-ari and an additional yuko point to close the five-minute bout.

References

External links
 

1981 births
Living people
People from Kutaisi
Male judoka from Georgia (country)
Olympic judoka of Georgia (country)
Judoka at the 2004 Summer Olympics
Sportspeople from Tbilisi